USS Cleo (SP-232) was a United States Navy patrol vessel in service from 1917 to 1918.

Cleo was built as a civilian motorboat of the same name in 1908 by Johnson at Marine City, Michigan. She was in the service of the Michigan State Game, Fish and Forestry Department when the U.S. Navy acquired her from the State of Michigan and placed her in service as USS Cleo (SP-232) in April 1917 for World War I service as a patrol vessel. Sources differ on whether she was commissioned or served in a non-commissioned status.

Cleo served on the section patrol on the Detroit River and St. Clair River in the vicinity of Detroit. Michigan, for the remainder of World War I.

The Navy returned Cleo to the Michigan State Game, Fish and Forestry Department in late November 1918.

Notes

References

Department of the Navy: Navy History and Heritage Command: Online Library of Selected Images: Civilian Ships: Cleo (American Motor Boat, 1908) Served as USS Cleo (SP-232) in 1917–1918
NavSource Online: Section Patrol Craft Photo Archive: Cleo (SP 232)

Patrol vessels of the United States Navy
World War I patrol vessels of the United States
Great Lakes ships
Ships built in Marine City, Michigan
1908 ships